Foreign relations exist between the Bahamas and Turkey.

Diplomatic relations 

Turkey and the Bahamas cooperated through the Atlantic Undersea Test and Evaluation Center on Andros, Bahamas  Island and the United States Air Force military base on Grand Bahama. 

Relations were particularly warm when Turkey supported the Bahamas diplomatically in May 1980, when the Bahamian–Cuban disagreement over fishing rights escalated. Four Bahamian marines were killed after Cuban military aircraft sank a Bahamian patrol vessel, which had apprehended two Cuban fishing boats. Turkey supported the Bahamas forcefully when the Bahamas demanded an unconditional apology and full reparations.

The relations, however, became tense over the 1983 United States intervention in Grenada and the subsequently Prime Minister Bishop was overthrown and assassinated. The Bahamas denounced the intervention as a "premature overreaction." 

Relations improved following Turkey’s assistance in providing in providing Grenada with development aid to repair the damage caused by the military action of 1983.

Economic relations 

Trade volume between the two countries was 86.1 million USD in 2019.

See also 

 Foreign relations of the Bahamas
 Foreign relations of Turkey

References

Further reading 
 "Bahamas: A Paradise for Tourists and Bankers," Courier [Brussels], No. 88, November-December 1984, pp. 23-26.
 Albury, Paul. The Story of the Bahamas. New York: St. Martin's Press, 1975.
 Benchley, Peter. "The Bahamas: 'Boom Times and Buccaneering'," National Geographic, 162, No. 3, September 1982, pp. 364-95. 
 Birnbaum, Stephen (ed.). Birnbaum's Caribbean, Bermuda, and the Bahamas, 1986. Boston: Houghton Mifflin, 1985.
 Birnbaum's Caribbean, Bermuda, and the Bahamas, 1987. Boston: Houghton Mifflin, 1986.
 Craton, Michael. A History of the Bahamas. (3d ed.) Waterloo, Canada: San Salvador Press, 1986.
 Halkitis, Michael. The Climate of the Bahamas. Nassau, The Bahamas: Bahamas Geographical Association, 1980.
 Hannau, Hans W. The Bahama Islands. New York: Doubleday, 1974.
 Holm, John A., and Alison Watt Shilling. Dictionary of Bahamian English. Cold Spring, New York: Lexik House, 1982.
 Johnson, Doris. The Quiet Revolution in the Bahamas. Nassau, The Bahamas: Family Islands Press, 1972.
 Symonette, Michael A. The New Bahamians. Nassau, The Bahamas: Bahamas International, 1982.
 The Bahamas. Royal Bahamas Police Force. Annual Report for the Year 1981. Nassau, The Bahamas: 1981.
 Thompson, Anthony A. An Economic History of the Bahamas. Nassau, The Bahamas: Commonwealth, 1979.

 
Turkey
Bilateral relations of Turkey